The Pazhou Pagoda, also known as the Whampoa Pagoda or Pa Chow Pogoda, is an early modern Chinese pagoda on Pazhou Island in Haizhu District, Guangzhou, the capital of China's Guangdong Province.

History 
The Whampoa Pagoda initiated work in 1597 and it was completely  built in 1600. The pagoda is situated on a knoll at the south bank of Pearl River. Although it was built as a Buddhist landmark, it was also a useful navigation point for merchant ships traveling to Guangzhou.

Architecture
It is an octagonal tower with 9 main sections and 17 sub sections. It covers a total area of 111 square metres.

Functioning in a similar fashion to Chigang Pagoda, it was built for Fengshui and allow safe navigation of merchant ships traveling along the Pearl River towards Guangzhou.

Gallery

References

External links 

Buildings and structures completed in 1600
Buddhist temples in Guangzhou
Pagodas in China
Ming dynasty architecture